Dobřínsko is a municipality and village in Znojmo District in the South Moravian Region of the Czech Republic. It has about 400 inhabitants.

References

Villages in Znojmo District